Craig Logan (born 22 April 1969) is a Scottish musician, songwriter, and manager. He began his career as bassist in the pop band Bros.

Career
In early 1989, Logan left Bros to focus on songwriting and producing. Kim Appleby's song "Don't Worry", which he co-wrote with Appleby (who he also managed) and George Deangelis, was nominated for an Ivor Novello Award in the 'Best Contemporary Song' category in 1991. At the age of 25, Logan joined EMI Music as VP of International, which he ran for three years. During this time, he worked with a range of artists including Robbie Williams, Tina Turner, Iron Maiden and Garth Brooks.

In 1999, Logan left EMI to work with artist manager Roger Davies. He went on to oversee worldwide tours and releases for acts including Tina Turner, Sade, Joe Cocker and M People before meeting Pink, whom he signed and co-managed with Davies for several years.

In 2006, Logan joined SonyBMG UK (now Sony Music) as the Managing Director of the RCA Label Group. Working with acts such as Beyonce, Justin Timberlake, Pink, Sade, Alicia Keys, The Script etc., achieving label of the year after his first 12 months.

He left Sony Music in 2010 to start his new venture, Logan Media Entertainment (LME), which was established in 2011. LME now have offices in both London and Los Angeles and the company is currently managing Anastacia, Dido, Alfie Boe, Imelda May, Beverley Knight, Roachford and Lara Fabian. As well as having a record label (HiTea) and a publishing imprint.

In 2022, Logan set up Tag8 Music in association with BMG Rights Management. This was the first new UK-based record label set up within the BMG group since 2009, with Tag8 Music featuring established acts such as Pixie Lott, Roachford, and Louise Redknapp on its roster. On the Official Albums Chart Top 100 of 4 November 2022, the label charted its first hit album in the form of Blue's Heart & Soul, which entered at number 22.

References

Living people
Scottish pop guitarists
British bass guitarists
Male bass guitarists
1969 births
Place of birth missing (living people)
People from Kirkcaldy
Bros (British band) members
Music managers